Without a Net is a recording of the Grateful Dead performing live in concert.

Without a Net may also refer to:
 Without a Net (Wayne Shorter album), 2013
 Without a Net: Librarians Bridging the Digital Divide, a 2011 book by Jessamyn West
 Without a Net: The Female Experience of Growing Up Working Class, a 2004 book by Michelle Tea
 Without a Net (film), a 2012 documentary film

See also
 Live Without a Net (disambiguation)